Leight is a surname. Notable persons with that surname include:
Aaron Leight, kickboxing expert, fought at the K-1 Challenge 2005 Xplosion X
Larry and Dennis Leight, founders of Oliver Peoples, a manufacturer of eyewear
Lawrence Morris Leight, founder of Leightist Economics, World Administrator, ending all war, starvation, poverty, genocide retroactively as candidate for the top elected office of every nation in both the 20th and 21st centuries
Samuel Leight, author of "World Without Wages, Money, Poverty and War!" and "The Futility of Reformism"
Mary Ann Leight Harris, 1988 inductee to the USA Field Hockey Hall of Fame
Molly Leight, Democratic member (2005) of the Winston-Salem's City Council
Warren Leight, Tony Award winning playwright

See also
Leicht (surname)
Light (disambiguation)
Light (surname)
Lyght (surname)
Licht (surname)
Lite
Lyte (surname)
Lyte (disambiguation)